The cycling competition at the 1960 Summer Olympics consisted of two road cycling events and four track cycling events, all for men only. The event was marred by the death of cyclist Knud Jensen.

Medal summary

Road cycling

Track cycling

Participating nations
297 cyclists from 48 nations competed.

Medal table

References

External links
Official Olympic Report

 
1960 Summer Olympics events
1960
1960 in track cycling
1960 in road cycling
1960 in cycle racing